The Hotel Seville is a historic hotel building at Vine and Ridge Streets in downtown Harrison, Arkansas.  It is an L-shaped three story wood-frame structure, finished in brick and terra cotta veneer with distinctive Spanish Revival (Mission) styling.  Its eastern entry porch is supported by polychrome terra cotta pillars, and portions of the exterior are finished in terra cotta tile with inset geometric patterns.  Built in 1929, the building is one of the most elaborate examples of Spanish Revival architecture in the state.  It was used as a hotel until the mid-1970s, when it was converted to elderly housing. It has since been converted back to a hotel.

The building was listed on the National Register of Historic Places in 1994.

See also
National Register of Historic Places listings in Boone County, Arkansas

References

Hotel buildings on the National Register of Historic Places in Arkansas
Mission Revival architecture in Arkansas
Buildings and structures completed in 1929
Buildings and structures in Harrison, Arkansas
National Register of Historic Places in Boone County, Arkansas
Historic district contributing properties in Arkansas
Hotels in Arkansas
1929 establishments in Arkansas